"Who's a Pretty Boy?" is an episode of the BBC sitcom Only Fools and Horses. It was the penultimate episode of Series 3 and was first broadcast on 22 December 1983. In the episode, Del persuades Denzil to let them redecorate his flat, despite his wife, Corrine's objections. Things go awry when they think they have killed Corrine's pet canary.

Synopsis
Del Boy wants revenge on Brendan O'Shaughnessy, a painter and decorator who sold him a tin of "apple white" paint that was actually battleship grey. Del senses his opportunity when Brendan reveals he is decorating the front room of Del's friend, Denzil. Del visits Denzil at his flat and claims that Brendan was responsible for a house he was decorating burning down when he and his crew were in the pub. Denzil drops his plan to hire Brendan, and Del offers to decorate his front room instead, much to the disapproval of Denzil's wife, Corrine.

The next day, Del, Rodney, and Grandad arrive at Denzil's flat and put the kettle on for a cup of tea, ignoring instructions to stay out of the kitchen. They accidentally leave the kettle on the hob for too long, burning a hole in it, and filling the kitchen with steam. After the steam disperses, they find Corrine's pet canary dead. Grandad goes to a pet shop and buys a new canary for £45. When Corrine returns, she is shocked by the appearance of the new canary, telling the Trotters that her canary had died that morning.

A few hours later, at The Nag's Head, Brendan announces that he will be taking over the job of decorating Denzil's flat. Then, the Trotters meet the pub's new landlord, Mike Fisher, and convince him to increase the brewery's bill of £1,000 for Brendan to redecorate the pub to £2,000 for Del to do the job. Mike is bemused since the first offer was cheaper for his brewery, so Del explains to him that from that money, he and Mike would take £500 each and give the other £1,000 to Brendan to do the job. Mike, in the knowledge that it would cost the brewery and not him, warmly agrees, and Del goes to speak with Brendan.

Episode cast

Eva Mottley, who played Corinne, made her only appearance in the series in this episode. She died of suicide by overdose on 14 February 1985. Though she was mentioned by Denzil in later episodes, John Sullivan never recast the role, out of respect for the actress. The pair eventually separated.

First appearances
Paul Barber as Denzil Tulser
Kenneth MacDonald as Mike Fisher

References

External links

 https://www.comedy.co.uk/tv/only_fools_and_horses/episodes/3/7/ at British Comedy Guide

1983 British television episodes
Birds in popular culture
Only Fools and Horses (series 3) episodes